The Three Buckaroos is a 1922 American silent Western film directed by Fred J. Balshofer, starring Fred Humes, Peggy O'Day and Monte Montague.

Cast
 Fred Humes as Dartigan 
 Peggy O'Day as Constance Kingsley
 Monte Montague as Athor 
 Tex Keith as Forthor
 Bill Conant as Aramor 
 Al Ernest Garcia as 'Card' Ritchie
 Cleo Childers as Flores

References

Bibliography
 Connelly, Robert B. The Silents: Silent Feature Films, 1910-36, Volume 40, Issue 2. December Press, 1998.
 Munden, Kenneth White. The American Film Institute Catalog of Motion Pictures Produced in the United States, Part 1. University of California Press, 1997.

External links
 

1922 films
1922 Western (genre) films
1920s English-language films
American silent feature films
Silent American Western (genre) films
American black-and-white films
Films directed by Fred J. Balshofer
1920s American films